Ahmet Koç is a Turkish bağlama artist.

Before the "Paradoks" 

He appeared and played bağlama with the female singer Şebnem Paker at Eurovision Song Contest 1997, in Dublin, where they represented Turkey and came in 3rd place. His previous works include his own instrumental works "Yedi Karanfil 3", "Yediveren Anadolu" and "Yol Türküleri, as well as his contributions to a multitude of other artists' albums as music director or bağlama artist. Ahmet Koç continues his career at the Turkish Ministry of Culture as bağlama artist, arranger and musicolog.

"Paradoks" Era 

In the spring of 2005, he released his instrumental album "Paradoks" (Paradox), in which he played international pop and rock classics with his bağlama.  Some of the songs included in his album were: “Hasta Siempre”, "Fragile", “My Way”, “Surf Rider”, ”Hotel California” “The Godfather theme”, “Shape of My Heart”, “My Heart Will Go On”.

"Sağanak" Era 

In the last quarter of 2006, Ahmet Koç released his fifth album, the Sağanak (means heavy rain in Turkish). This new effort is a double disc pack (one part is for Turkish songs and the other part -same as the Paradoks- is for international hits). The first single released from the album is Görevimiz Tehlike (Mission: Impossible theme).

References

Turkish folk musicians
Living people
Year of birth missing (living people)